Ethnopolitical Association "Russians", or simply Russians (Русские), was a Russian nationalist organization founded in 2011 by Dmitry Demushkin and Alexander Potkin (Belov). It was outlawed on 28 October 2015 by a Moscow court after being designated as an extremist group.

References

2011 establishments in Russia
Banned far-right parties
Banned political parties in Russia
Defunct nationalist parties in Russia
Political parties disestablished in 2015
Political parties established in 2011
Russian nationalist organizations
2015 disestablishments in Russia
Defunct far-right parties
Far-right political parties in Russia